Henry "Sonny" Elms (c. 1861 – 14 September 1928) was an Australian rules football coach with South Melbourne in the Victorian Football League (VFL).

He had previously played 215 games for the club in the VFA between 1882 and 1895, being part of premiership teams in 1885 and 1888–1890. Elms was the first player in Victorian elite football to play 200 games (achieving this in round 20 of 1893), while his career total remained a South Melbourne club record until it was broken in Round 5 of the 1902 VFL season by teammate Bill Windley.  

He was also South Melbourne captain between 1885, when the club won their second premiership, and 1894.

He was made coach in 1918 and shared the duties with former player and teammate Herb Howson. After the club defeated Collingwood by five points in the Grand Final, they became the first pair to coach a premiership team. He remained the coach for the 1919 season and finished with a coaching record of 27 wins from 33 games.

References

External links
Coaching stats from AFL Tables

Sydney Swans coaches
Sydney Swans Premiership coaches
Place of birth missing
Year of birth missing
Australian rules footballers from Victoria (Australia)
1928 deaths
One-time VFL/AFL Premiership coaches